Burj Attari is a town located only 14 km from Lahore at Lahore-Jaranwala Road, Pakistan and 12 km from Shahdara, but it is in the Sheikhupura District, Punjab (Pakistan).

Burj Attari is famous for agriculture products and fruits like guavas, leechee and strawberries. It is a very ancient village from since 1400 A.D.

Noorewala Road a 6 km long sub-road leads to a small village Noor-e-wala and Khanpur Canal (Bann), further goes village Bansi-Nagar and Battiyanwala (located at Lahore-Shekhupura road) making a total length of 13.2 km. Burj road connects village Burj with the M-2 motorway. Noorewala Road also goes to Nankana Sahib.

Populated places in Sheikhupura District